Oplomus is a genus of predatory stink bugs in the family Pentatomidae. There are about nine described species in Oplomus.

Species
These nine species belong to the genus Oplomus:
 Oplomus anonotatus Uhler
 Oplomus catena Drury, 1782
 Oplomus cruentus (Burmeister, 1835)
 Oplomus dichrous (Herrich-Schaeffer, 1838)
 Oplomus festivus Dallas, 1851
 Oplomus marginalis Westwood, 1837
 Oplomus mundus Stål, 1862
 Oplomus pulchriventris Horvath, 1911
 Oplomus salamandra (Burmeister, 1835)

References

Further reading

External links

Asopinae
Pentatomidae genera
Articles created by Qbugbot